Chetab may refer to:
 Chetab-e Olya
 Chetab-e Sofla